Miconia salicifolia is a species of shrub in the family Melastomataceae. It is native to South America.

References

salicifolia
Flora of Peru
Flora of Colombia
Flora of Ecuador
Flora of Venezuela